Austropezia is a genus of fungi within the Hyaloscyphaceae family. This is a monotypic genus, containing the single species Austropezia samuelsii.

References

External links
Austropezia at Index Fungorum

Hyaloscyphaceae
Monotypic Leotiomycetes genera